Gunnhildur Yrsa Jónsdóttir (born 28 September 1988) is an Icelandic professional footballer who plays as a midfielder for Stjarnan of the Besta deild kvenna and the Iceland national team.

Early life
Born in Garðabær, Iceland, Gunnhildur lived in Hartford, Connecticut and Philadelphia from 1996 to 2002 while her mother studied paediatrics. During a chance meeting with Philadelphia Charge and Iceland international Margrét Rannveig Ólafsdóttir in 2001, Margrét offered Gunnhildur tickets to the team's next WUSA game, inspiring her to take up football.

Club career

Stjarnan
Upon returning to Iceland, Gunnhildur joined Úrvalsdeild side Stjarnan. She made her senior first-team debut on 20 May 2003 at the age of 14 years and 234 days as a 59th-minute substitute in a 4–0 league loss to ÍBV. In 2011, she captained Stjarnan to the first Úrvalsdeild title in club history, scoring 7 goals in 18 appearances. She captained the team to their first Icelandic Cup win the following season, scoring the only goal in the 81st-minute in a 1–0 win over Valur in the final. In 2012 Stjarnan also won the Icelandic Super Cup and made their UEFA Women's Champions League debut against fellow Russian debutants Zorky Krasnogorsk in September 2012. Gunnhildur started the game but was sent off in the 37th-minute for a second booking, leaving Stjarnan to play out a goalless draw. They lost the away leg, for which Gunnhildur was suspended, 3–1.

Pepperdine Waves semester
In 2010, Gunnhildur transferred from Reykjavík University to study at Pepperdine University for a semester and spent one season playing college soccer for Pepperdine Waves. She made 19 appearances and was an All-WCC honorable mention as a freshman before returning to Iceland.

Move to Norway
In January 2013, Gunnhildur was recruited by Norwegian Toppserien side Arna-Bjørnar to replace homegrown talisman Maren Mjelde following her transfer to Bundesliga team Turbine Potsdam. She scored her first goal for the club on 5 June 2013 in a 2–0 win over Åsane in the Norwegian Cup. In total she made 16 appearances in 18 months, scoring two cup goals.

In July 2014, Gunnhildur transferred to fellow Toppserien side IK Grand Bodø midway through the season. She scored her only goal for the team on 30 August 2014 in a 5–2 league defeat to Stabæk.

Ahead of the 2015 season, Gunnhildur joined Stabæk. She played in every league game and scored three goals as Stabæk finished fourth. She played in all but one game in the following season, recording her Toppserien-best six goals as Stabæk finished in third place.

Ahead of the 2017 season, Gunnhildur was one of several senior internationals recruited by Vålerenga as they invested in their women's team to push for a first league title and Champions League qualification. She captained the team as they reached their first Norwegian Cup final, losing 1–0 to Avaldsnes IL. Vålerenga finished seventh in the league.

Utah Royals
In January 2018, Gunnhildur signed with NWSL expansion side Utah Royals for the team's inaugural season. On 24 March 2018, she scored the first goal in club history, giving Utah a lead over Orlando Pride in the third minute. The game finished 1–1. She was named to the NWSL team of the month for March 2018. Gunnhildur played every minute of the 2018 NWSL season with Utah, registering one goal and two assists. She also appeared in every game during the 2019 season, scoring one goal and finishing second on the team for assists with four. With the 2020 season cancelled due to the coronavirus pandemic, Gunnhildur made four appearances during the small schedule 2020 NWSL Challenge Cup replacement tournament. In December 2020, it was announced that the Royals would cease operations and relocate to Kansas City, transferring all player assets in the process. Prior to the team dissolving, Gunnhildur led the franchise with a record 52 appearances.

Loan to Adelaide United
During the NWSL offseason,Gunnhildur was one of six Utah Royals players loaned to the W-League for the 2018–19 season. She joined Adelaide United alongside Iceland teammate Fanndís Fridriksdóttir and played every minute of the season, scoring one goal.

Loan to Valur
Following the conclusion of the 2020 NWSL Challenge Cup, Gunnhildur opted to spend the rest of the year on loan with Valur. It marked the first time since 2012 she had played for a club in her native Iceland. The team finished second on a points-per-game basis following the abandonment of the Úrvalsdeild in October with two rounds to go. Gunnhildur scored three goals in eight league appearances and also scored her first career Champions League goal on 4 November 2020 in a first round qualifying 3–0 win against HJK.

Orlando Pride
On 30 January 2021, Gunnhildur was traded to Orlando Pride along with the playing rights to Erika Tymrak in exchange for Kristen Edmonds and the natural second-round pick in the 2022 NWSL Draft. On 24 January 2023, Orlando announced Gunnhildur would be departing the club to return to Iceland with wife and teammate Erin McLeod following their marriage earlier in the month.

Stjarnan return
On 25 January 2023, Gunnhildur rejoined hometown club Stjarnan 10 years after she last captained the team.

International career
Gunnhildur made her senior international debut for Iceland on 26 October 2011 as an 89th-minute substitute in a 2–0 win over Northern Ireland during UEFA Women's Euro 2013 qualifying. It was her only appearance in the competition as Iceland qualified for Euro 2013 but she was not selected for the tournament roster.

On 4 April 2015, she scored her first goal for Iceland on her 18th cap in a 2–1 friendly win over the Netherlands.

Gunnhildur played in every match for Iceland during UEFA Women's Euro 2017 qualifying, scoring two goals as Iceland won their group and qualified for Euro 2017. She was named to the tournament squad, her first major international tournament, and started all three games as Iceland lost all three, finishing bottom of the group.<

Gunnhildur competed with the Iceland at the 2016 and 2017 Algarve Cup.

Gunnhildur played all eight games of 2019 FIFA Women's World Cup qualification and scored four goals including her first career international brace in an 8–0 win against the Faroe Islands. Iceland finished second in their qualifying group, missing out on the play-offs by one point.

Gunnhildur once again started every game during UEFA Women's Euro 2022 qualifying as Iceland finished second in the group to Sweden with six wins, a draw and a loss. They qualified for their third successive Euro finals as one of the best-placed runners-up.

Personal life
Gunnhildur, also known as Gunny, has seven siblings: Tindur, Urður, Ilmur, Þórunn, Sigurður, Sæmundur, and Elfur; her parents are Laufey Sigurðardóttir and Jón Saemundsson.

In October 2020, it was made public that Gunnhildur is in a relationship with Canadian footballer Erin McLeod. They married in January 2023.

Career statistics

Club summary 
.

International summary

International goals
 As of match played 12 April 2022. Iceland score listed first, score column indicates score after each Jónsdóttir goal.

Honors
Stjarnan
Úrvalsdeild: 2011
Icelandic Cup: 2012
Icelandic Super Cup: 2012

References

External links
 
 
 

1988 births
Living people
People from Garðabær
Gunnhildur Yrsa Jonsdottir
Gunnhildur Yrsa Jonsdottir
Women's association football midfielders
Gunnhildur Yrsa Jonsdottir
Pepperdine Waves women's soccer players
Arna-Bjørnar players
IK Grand Bodø players
Stabæk Fotball Kvinner players
Vålerenga Fotball Damer players
Utah Royals FC players
Adelaide United FC (A-League Women) players
Gunnhildur Yrsa Jonsdottir
Orlando Pride players
Gunnhildur Yrsa Jonsdottir
Toppserien players
National Women's Soccer League players
A-League Women players
Gunnhildur Yrsa Jonsdottir
Gunnhildur Yrsa Jonsdottir
Gunnhildur Yrsa Jonsdottir
Expatriate women's footballers in Norway
Expatriate women's soccer players in the United States
Expatriate women's soccer players in Australia
Lesbian sportswomen
LGBT association football players
Icelandic LGBT sportspeople
UEFA Women's Euro 2022 players
UEFA Women's Euro 2017 players